The Order of battle, Keren 1941 shows Italian army forces that participated in the Battle of Keren from February to March 1941 and British troops in Sudan on 20 January 1941, which participated in military operations against Eritrea during the East African Campaign 1940–1941.

Regio Esercito at Keren, 1941

7 February 1941
 Zelale Sector: Colonel Francesco Prina
 52nd Colonial Battalion (11th Brigade)
 9th Colonial Battalion (2nd Brigade)
 1 Battery, 81 mm mortars
 Sanchil Sector: Colonel Corsi
 2nd Grenadier Battalion
 "Tipo" Colonial Battalion
 51st Colonial Battalion
 97th Colonial Battalion
 3rd Bersagliere Battalion
 104th Artillery Group
 10th Anti-Tank Battery, 5th Artillery Group, 4 miscellaneous anti-tank guns
 Mount Amba Sector: Colonel Adolfo Oliveti
 56th Colonial Battalion (11th Brigade)
 63rd Colonial Battalion (11th Brigade)
 106th Colonial Battalion (5th Brigade)
 2nd Artillery Group
 1st Battalion, Garrison Commanders Reserve
 10th Colonial Battalion
 4th "Toselli" Colonial Battalion

5 March 1941
 Begana Zelale-Falestoh Sector:
 11th Colonial Brigade
 51st, 52nd, 56th, 63rd Battalion
 44th Artillery Group (65/17 guns, camel transported)
 1 Battery, 75 mm/13 guns
 Dologorodoc–Sanchil Sector:
 2nd Grenadier Battalion
 "Tipo" Colonial Battalion
 11th Artillery Group (65/17 guns)
 5th Artillery Group (65/17 guns)
 Anti-Aircraft Battery (20 mm guns)
 Anti-Tank Battery (47/32 guns)
 Mount Amba–Brig's Peak–Rotunda Sector:
 5th Colonial Brigade
 97th & 106th Battalion
 Alpini "Work Amba" Battalion
 5th Colonial Battalion
 1st/60th Artillery Group (65 mm/17 guns)
 Artillery Group (105 mm/28 howitzers)
 Anti-Aircraft Battery (75 mm/27 Ck guns)
 Samana (Beit–Garbru–Dobac) Sector:
 12th Colonial Brigade
 36th, 41st & 103rd Battalions
 77 mm/28 Battery
 65 mm/17 Battery
 4th Colonial Battalion
 Northern Sector:
 2nd Colonial Brigade
 9th, 10th & 151st Battalion
 6th Colonial Brigade
 19th, 24th, 31st & 34th Battalion
 44th Black Shirt Battalion
 2nd Artillery Group (65 mm/17 guns)
 6th Artillery Group (65 mm/17 guns)
 13th Artillery Group (65mm/17 guns)
 2 Batteries (77 mm/28 guns)
 Garrison Commander's Reserve
 11th Black Shirt Legion (2 battalions)
 44th Colonial Brigade
 105th & 105th Battalion
 3 Independent Black Shirt Companies
 15th Squadron, Cavalry Group

24 March 1941
 Begana–Zelale–Falestoh Sector: Colonel Vincenzo Ossoli
 Combined Colonial Battalion
 Remnants 52nd & 63rd Battalion
 105th Colonial Battalion
 1 Battery, 106th Artillery Group
 Dologorodoc–Sanchil Sector: Colonel Francesco Prina
 50th Colonial Battalion
 Alpini "Work Amba" Battalion
 Combined 57th/85th Colonial Battalion
 Combined 51st/56th Colonial Battalion
 21st & 46th Batteries, 5th Artillery Group (65 mm/17 guns)
 Mount Sanchil Sector: Colonel Corsi
 11th Regiment, Savoia Grenadiers
 1st Grenadiers Battalion
 3rd Bersaglieri Battalion
 10th Battery, 5th Artillery Group
 Mount Amba Sector: Colonel Adolfo Oliveti
 5th Colonial Battalion
 106th Colonial Battalion
 11th Black Shirt Legion
 3rd Carabiniere Company
 Artillery Group (100 mm/57 howitzers)
 Sama Sector: Colonel Livio Bonelli
 36th Colonial Battalion
 41st Colonial Battalion
 Northern Sector:
 2nd Colonial Brigade
 6th Colonial Brigade
 12th Artillery Group
 Garrison Commander's Reserve
 99th Colonial Battalion
 132nd Colonial Battalion
 15th Squadron, Cavalry Group

HQ Troops Sudan
HQ Troops Sudan Lieutenant-General (acting) William Platt
 Force Troops
 "B" Squadron, 4th Royal Tank Regiment
 1st Independent Anti-Tank Troop
 68th (4th West Lancashire) Medium Regiment, RA (RHQ, 233 Battery, Signal Section & Light Aid Detachment)
 212 Battery, 64th (London) Medium Rgt – attached
 25th Heavy AA Battery, 9th HAA Regiment
 41st Light AA Battery, 15th (Manx) LAA Regiment
 1st Survey Troop, 4th Survey Regiment, RA
 514th Field Survey Company, RE
 Detachment, 3rd HQ Signals
 No. 51 Commando
 No. 52 Commando
 Sudan Horse, X and Y LAA Batteries, Sudan Defence Force

4th Indian Infantry Division

(Major-General Noel Beresford-Peirse)
 5th Indian Infantry Brigade (Brigadier Wilfrid Lewis Lloyd)
 HQ 5th Indian Infantry Brigade
 5th Indian Infantry Brigade Signal Section
 5th Indian Infantry Brigade Anti-Tank Company
 5th Indian Infantry Brigade Light Aid Detachment
 1st Royal Fusiliers
 3rd Bn 1st Punjab Regiment
 4th Bn 6th Rajputana Rifles
 11th Indian Infantry Brigade (Brigadier Reginald Savory)
 HQ 11th Indian Infantry Brigade
 11th Indian Infantry Brigade Section
 11th Indian Infantry Brigade Anti-Tank Company
 11th Indian Infantry Brigade Light Aid Detachment
 2nd Bn Cameron Highlanders
 1/6th Rajputana Rifles
 3/14th Punjab Regiment
 Gazelle Force (Colonel Frank Messervy) (ad hoc mobile force under command of 5th Indian Infantry Brigade from 11 February. Disbanded 15 February)
 1st Horse (Skinner's Horse) – detached from duty as 5th Indian Infantry Division reconnaissance regiment
 1 Troop 'P' Battery Royal Horse Artillery
 1 Troop 28 Field Regiment RA (18-pounders)
 4 Ordnance Workshop Section
 170 Cavalry Field Ambulance (less det)
 1 Motor Machine-Gun Group Sudan Defence Force (2, 4 and 6 Coys)
 Divisional Troops
 The Central India Horse (21st King George V's Own Horse) - divisional reconnaissance regiment
 HQ 4th Indian Division Employment Platoon
 Artillery (Brigadier William H B Mirrlees)
 HQ 4th Indian Divisional Artillery
 1st Field Regiment (11/80th Battery, 52/98th Battery, Signal Section & Light Aid Detachment)
 25th Field Regiment (31/58th Battery, 12/25th Battery, Signal Section & Light Aid Detachment)
 31st Field Regiment (105/119th Battery, 106/118th Battery, Signal Section & Light Aid Detachment)
 Engineers
 HQ 4th Indian Divisional Engineers
 4th Field Company Sappers & Miners
 12th Field Company Sappers & Miners
 18th Field Company Sappers & Miners
 11th Field Park Company Sappers & Miners
 Signals
 4th Indian Divisional Signals (and Light Aid Detachment)
 Supplies & Transport
 HQ 4th Indian Division RIASC
 Divisional HQ Mechanical Transport Company RIASC
 4th Indian Division Supply Column (Light Aid Detachment)
 4th Indian Division Ammunition Company (Light Aid Detachment)
 4th Indian Division Petrol Company (Light Aid Detachment)
 12th Supply Issue Section
 13th Supply Issue Section
 14th Supply Issue Section
 15th Supply Issue Section
 Medical
 14th Indian Field Ambulance
 17th Indian Field Ambulance
 19th Indian Field Ambulance
 15th Indian Field Hygiene Section
 2nd Indian Casualty Clearing Station
 Ordnance
 17th Mobile Workshop Company
 18th Mobile Workshop Company
 19th Mobile Workshop Company
 20th Mobile Workshop Company
 21st Mobile Workshop Company
 Miscellaneous
 13th Field Post Office
 17th Field Post Office
 19th Field Post Office
 25th Field Post Office
 4th Indian Divisional Provost Unit

5th Indian Infantry Division

(Major-General Lewis Heath)
 9th Indian Infantry Brigade (Brigadier A.G.O.M. Mayne to late February then acting Brigadier F. W. Messervy)
 HQ 9th Indian Infantry Brigade
 9th Indian Infantry Brigade Signal Section
 2nd West Yorkshire Regiment
 3/5th Mahratta Light Infantry
 3 Royal/12th Frontier Force Regiment
 10th Indian Infantry Brigade (Lieutenant-Colonel Bernard Fletcher acting commander until 20 March, then Brigadier Thomas "Pete" Rees)
 HQ 10th Indian Infantry Brigade
 10th Indian Infantry Brigade Signal Section
 2nd Highland Light Infantry
 4/10th Baluch Regiment
 3/18th Royal Garhwal Rifles
 29th Indian Infantry Brigade (Brigadier J. C. O. Marriott)
 HQ 29th Indian Infantry Brigade
 29th Indian Infantry Brigade Signal Section
 1st Bn Worcester Regiment
 3/2nd Punjab Regiment
 6 Royal/13th Frontier Force Rifles
 Divisional Troops
 1st Horse (Skinner's Horse) – Divisional reconnaissance regiment detached from duty to Gazelle Force until 15 February
 HQ 5th Indian Division Employment Platoon
 5th Indian Divisional Anti-Tank Company
 Artillery (Brigadier Claud Vallentin)
 HQ 5th Indian Divisional Artillery
 4th Field Regiment (less one troop) (4/14th Battery, 7/66th Battery, Signal Section & Light Aid Detachment)
 28th Field Regiment (less one troop) (1/5th Battery, 3/57th Battery, Signal Section & Light Aid Detachment)
 144th Army Field Regiment (less one Troop) (389th Battery, 390th Battery, Signal Section & Light Aid Detachment)
 Jammu & Kashmir Mountain Battery Indian State Forces
 5th Indian Division Ammunition Unit
 Engineers
 HQ 5th Indian Divisional Engineers
 2nd Field Company Sappers & Miners
 20th Field Company Sappers & Miners
 21st Field Company Sappers & Miners
 44th Field Park Company Sappers & Miners
 Signals
 5th Indian Divisional Signals
 Supplies & Transport
 HQ 5th Indian Division RIASC
 20th Supply Issue Section
 32nd Supply Issue Section
 33rd Supply Issue Section
 52nd Divisional HQ Mechanical Transport Section
 14th Indian Mechanical Transport Company
 15th Indian Mechanical Transport Company (less 28 Section)
 29th Indian Mechanical Transport Company
 Medical
 3rd Indian Casualty Clearing Station
 10th Indian Field Ambulance
 20th Indian Field Ambulance
 7th Indian Field Hygiene Section
 12th Indian Field Hygiene Section
 Ordnance
 22nd Mobile Workshop Company
 23rd Mobile Workshop Company
 24th Mobile Workshop Company
 25th Mobile Workshop Company
 26th Mobile Workshop Company
 Miscellaneous
 15th Field Post Office
 23rd Field Post Office
 24th Field Post Office
 5th Indian Divisional Provost Unit
 7th Indian Infantry Brigade (Brigadier Harold Rawdon Briggs) (Detached from 4th Indian Infantry Division as a reinforced independent brigade group known as Briggsforce)
 HQ, 7th Indian Infantry Brigade
 7th Indian Infantry Brigade Signal Section
 7th Indian Infantry Brigade Anti-Tank Company
 7th Indian Infantry Brigade Light Aid Detachment
 1st Royal Sussex Regiment
 4/11th Sikh Regiment (detached to Force Troops)
 4/16th Punjab Regiment

Brigade of the East (Brigade d'Orient)
Data taken from Ghémard (2017) unless noted.
(Free French) - Colonel Raoul Magrin-Vernerey (nom de guerre Ralph Monclar)
 1er Bataillon de Legion Etrangere (1st Battalion of French Foreign Legion)
 Batallion de Marche 3 (3rd provisional battalion of Senegalese tirailleurs)
 3e Cie du 1er bataillon d' infanterie de marine (3rd Company 1st marine infantry battalion)
 1er Escadron de Spahis Marocains (1st Squadron of Moroccan Spahis)
 1er Groupe d'Artillerie Coloniale (1st Colonial artillery battalion)
 4th motor machine-gun company of the Sudan Defence Force
 One Battery from 25th Field Regiment, Royal Artillery (Indian 4th Infantry Division)
 12th Field Company Queen Victoria's Own Madras Sappers & Miners, IE

Footnotes

References

 
 .
 
 
 
 
 
 
 
 
 
 
 
 
 

World War II orders of battle
Middle East theatre of World War II